Moru (also Romanized as Morū‘ and Morrū‘; also known as Maroo’i) is a village in Chah-e Mobarak Rural District, Chah-e Mobarak District, Asaluyeh County, Bushehr Province, Iran. At the 2006 census, its population was 375, in 62 families.

References 

Populated places in Asaluyeh County